Budu Zivzivadze  (born 10 March 1994) is a Georgian professional footballer who plays as a striker for 2. Bundesliga club Karlsruher SC and the Georgia national team.

Club career
Budu signed with Danish Superliga club Esbjerg fB in January 2017, but did not play much until he was loaned out to Dinamo Tbilisi for the 2018 season. He did very well, scoring 28 goals in all competitions. After returning to Esbjerg, the club announced on 29 January 2019, that he had left the club, this time permanently, after his contract was terminated by mutual consent.

Two days later, it was announced, that he had re-joined Torpedo Kutaisi.

Six months later, he signed for Nemzeti Bajnokság I side Mezőkövesd.

On 11 February 2022, Zivzivadze was loaned by Fehérvár to Újpest until the end of the season.

On 31 January 2023, the last day of the 2022–23 winter transfer window, Zivzivadze signed with 2. Bundesliga club Karlsruher SC until 2025. His contract with Fehérvár had been due to run out in the summer.

International career
Zivzivadze made his debut for the Georgia national team in a friendly match against Uzbekistan on 23 January 2017. He scored his first goal for the senior national team on 25 March 2022, the only goal in a 1–0 friendly win against Bosnia and Herzegovina.

Career statistics
Scores and results list Georgia's goal tally first, score column indicates score after each Zivzivadze goal.

Honours
Samtredia
Georgian League: 2016

References

External links
  
 
 Esbjerg official profile
 

Living people
1994 births
People from Kutaisi
Footballers from Georgia (country)
Association football forwards
Georgia (country) international footballers
Georgia (country) under-21 international footballers
Erovnuli Liga players
Erovnuli Liga 2 players
Danish Superliga players
Danish 1st Division players
Nemzeti Bajnokság I players
FC Dinamo Tbilisi players
FC Torpedo Kutaisi players
FC Samtredia players
Esbjerg fB players
Mezőkövesdi SE footballers
Fehérvár FC players
Újpest FC players
Karlsruher SC players
Expatriate footballers from Georgia (country)
Expatriate sportspeople from Georgia (country) in Denmark
Expatriate men's footballers in Denmark
Expatriate sportspeople from Georgia (country) in Hungary
Expatriate footballers in Hungary
Expatriate sportspeople from Georgia (country) in Germany
Expatriate footballers in Germany